NGC 2808 is a globular cluster  in the constellation Carina. The cluster belongs to the Milky Way, and is one of our home galaxy's most massive clusters, containing more than a million stars.  It is estimated to be 12.5-billion years old.

The cluster is being disrupted by the galactic tide, trailing a long tidal tail.

Star generations
It had been thought that NGC 2808, like typical globular clusters, contains only one generation of stars formed simultaneously from the same material. In 2007, a team of astronomers led by Giampaolo Piotto of the University of Padua in Italy investigated Hubble Space Telescope images of NGC 2808 taken in 2005 and 2006 with Hubble's Advanced Camera for Surveys. Unexpectedly, they found that this cluster is composed of three generations of stars, all born within 200 million years of the formation of the cluster.

Astronomers have argued that globular clusters can produce only one generation of stars, because the radiation from first generation stars would drive the residual gas not consumed in the first star generation phase out of the cluster. However, the great mass of a cluster such as NGC 2808 may suffice to gravitationally counteract the loss of gaseous matter. Thus, a second and a third generation of stars may form.

An alternative explanation for the three star generations of NGC 2808 is that it may actually be the remnant core of a dwarf galaxy that collided with the Milky Way, the Sausage Galaxy.

See also
Messier 54 and Messier 79, two other extragalactic globular clusters
Omega Centauri

References

External links
 

Globular clusters
Carina (constellation)
2808
Canis Major Overdensity